Visible Secret is a 2001 Hong Kong horror comedy film directed by Ann Hui, starring Eason Chan, Shu Qi, Anthony Wong, Sam Lee, James Wong, Wayne Lai, Kara Hui, Tony Liu and Cheung Tat-ming.

Plot
Peter, a hairdresser, meets June, a nurse, at the disco one night and she becomes his girlfriend. She claims to have a spiritual "third eye" which allows her to see ghosts. As they become closer to each other, Peter starts to encounter visions of ghosts. After a vacation at a holiday resort, June befriends a boy in the neighbourhood. One day, Peter and June visit the boy at his house, and Peter is horrified to see that the boy's mother is under attack by two vicious ghosts, who are fighting for possession of her body. The boy is later found dead. Meanwhile, Peter's father commits suicide in hospital under strange circumstances.

Peter becomes suspicious of June and wants to break up with her, even when she tries to warn him that he is being targeted by a "headless ghost". When Peter's best friend, Simon, tells him that he was indeed possessed, Peter regains his trust in June and they start unraveling the mystery together by tracking down details of a horrific accident that happened at Sai Wan two decades ago. Peter's father had accidentally bumped into a man and caused the man to fall onto a railway, where he was knocked down by an incoming tram and was decapitated. The man is the "headless ghost" and he is seeking revenge on Peter and his father.

Cast
 Eason Chan as Peter Wong Choi
Man Kin-fung as young Peter
 Shu Qi as June / Wong Siu-kam
Kelly Moo as young June
 Anthony Wong as Wong-lin
 Sam Lee as Simon
 James Wong as Lo Kit
 Wayne Lai as Peter's brother
 Kara Hui as Siu-kam's mother
 Tony Liu as Master Tsang
 Cheung Tat-ming as Taxi driver
 Jo Kuk as Ghost on the subway
 Perry Chan as Dicky
 Tiffany Lee as Carmen
 Rashima Maheubani as Sue
 Ho Fili as Fatso
 Yau Man-shing as Ah-kow
 Chung Yiu-shing as Little Chung
 Tammy Ting as Tat's wife
 Lo Yan-yan as Cher
 Fok Lin as Aunt San
 Janet Chang as Singing woman
 Ng Wing-han as Nurse
 Lo Pui-ho as Boy in salon A
 Kung Siu-ling as Boy's mother
 Lee Wing-yin as Sue's friend
 Lau Ho-yee as Jake's girlfriend
 Ng Tat-lap as Youngster in salon B
 Lai Hing-san as Uncle Chan
 Lee Chi-ming as Snake Head
 Li Fung as Miss Wong

Release
Visible Secret was released in Hong Kong on 1 June 2001. In the Philippines, the film was released by Media Asia Films on 21 August 2003.

See also
Visible Secret 2 (2002)

References

External links

2001 films
2000s comedy horror films
Films directed by Ann Hui
Hong Kong ghost films
Hong Kong supernatural horror films
2000s Hong Kong films